Larrabee is a surname. Notable people with the surname include:

Charles H. Larrabee (1820–1883), American politician
Charles Xavier Larrabee (1843–1914), American businessman and co-founder of Fairhaven, Washington
Constance Stuart Larrabee (1914–2000), South African photographer
James W. Larrabee (1839–1907), American Civil War Medal of Honor recipient
Mike Larrabee (1933–2003), American sprinter and Olympic gold medalist
Jessica Larrabee, member of She Keeps Bees